Monroe County Airport  is a county-owned, public-use airport located two nautical miles (3.7 km) northwest of the central business district of Madisonville, a town in Monroe County, Tennessee, United States.

Although most U.S. airports use the same three-letter location identifier for the FAA and IATA, Monroe County Airport is assigned MNV by the FAA but has no designation from the IATA.

Facilities and aircraft 
It has one runway designated 5/23 with an asphalt surface measuring 3,641 by 75 feet (1,110 x 23 m).

For the 12-month period ending November 12, 2009, the airport had 10,800 aircraft operations, an average of 29 per day: 97% general aviation, 2% air taxi, and 1% military. At that time there were 19 aircraft based at this airport: 79% single-engine and 21% multi-engine.

References

External links 
 Monroe County Airport page at Tennessee DOT Airport Directory
 Aerial photo as of 24 March 1992 from USGS The National Map
 
 

Airports in Tennessee
Buildings and structures in Monroe County, Tennessee
Transportation in Monroe County, Tennessee